The 1992 Michigan Wolverines football team represented the University of Michigan in the 1992 NCAA Division I-A football season. The team's head coach was Gary Moeller. The Wolverines played their home games at Michigan Stadium. The team went undefeated—albeit with three ties—and won its fifth consecutive Big Ten Conference championship.

Schedule

Roster

Statistical achievements
Elvis Grbac established a Big Ten Conference career passing efficiency record that would stand for six seasons until it was surpassed by Joe Germaine. Grbac successfully defended his passing efficiency NCAA Division I FBS championship. On October 24, Derrick Alexander tied the conference single-game record with four touchdown receptions against Minnesota, becoming the fourth athlete to do so. The following season Minnesota's Omar Douglas broke the record with five. No Wolverine has matched this feat.

Tyrone Wheatley was the Big Ten rushing leader with 131.3 yards per conference game and 123.4 yards per game against all opponents. Wheatley also led the conference in scoring (for the first of two consecutive season) with an average of 9.3 points per game in all games, although he trailed Michigan State's Craig Thomas in conference games. Grbac led the conference in passing efficiency for the third consecutive year (157.9 efficiency in conference games and 150.2 in all games).

The team led the Big Ten in rushing offense both in conference games (284.8 yards per game) and all games (268.1 yards per game). It also led in passing efficiency for both conference games (148.3) and all games (148.1). It was the conference leader in total offense both for conference games (463.0 yards per game) and all games (466.9 yards per game). The Wolverines also led the Big Ten in scoring for conference games (35.0 points per game) and all games (35.9 points per game).

The team led the conference in rushing defense for the third of four consecutive years (six times in the 1990s) for all games by holding opponents to 90.8 yards per game. The team also led the conference for the second of five consecutive (six times in the 1990s) in rushing defense against conference opponents (78.6 yards per game). The team led the conference in total defense for all games (305.3), while Ohio State led for conference games. The team was led the conference in quarterback sacks for conference games (4.9 sacks per game) and all games (3.8 sacks per game). It led the conference in net punting average for conference games (35.9 yards), while Wisconsin led for all games.

The team extended the streak that set the conference record for most consecutive conference game wins (19) that stood until Ohio State eclipsed it in 2007. The team still holds the record for most consecutive conference road wins (17).

Wheatley established the following school records: career rushing touchdowns (47), eclipsing Rick Leach's 16-year-old record of 34 and broken six years later by Anthony Thomas; single-season yards per carry (7.34, min 75 carries), eclipsing Bill Daley's 49-year-old record of 6.81 and still standing; single-game yards per carry (11.79 - October 3, min 15 carries), eclipsing Ron Johnson's 24-year-old record of 11.19 and eclipsed by his own 15.70 performance in the January 1, 1993 Rose Bowl, which is still unsurpassed. On September 19 against Oklahoma State, Todd Collins set the school record for single-game pass completions (29), which would last until Tom Brady threw for 31 in 1998. That season, he set the current single-season pass completion record (65.3), surpassing Jim Harbaugh's 65.0 set in 1986 and tied by Elvis Grbac in 1991. Collins and Grbac posted the sixth and seventh four-touchdown pass single-game performance in school history.  For Grbac who was the first with two the prior season, this was his third time (a current record). Grbac extended his own career touchdown record set the prior season to 71. John Navarre would reach 72 in 2003. Grbac also ended his career as the school record holder in pass attempts (835), surpassing Steve Smith's 648 set in 1983 and broken by Navarre in 2003; pass completions (522), eclipsing Harbaugh's 387 set in 1986 and broken by Navarre in 2003; completion percentage (62.5), eclipsing Harbaugh's 62.4 and broken by Collins in 1994; career passing efficiency (148.1), eclipsing Harbaugh's 145.6 and still unbroken; passing yards (6460), eclipsing Harbaugh's career yardage record of 5449, but Navarre would eclipse this record in 2003; career 150-yard passing games (23) eclipsing Harbaugh's 19, tied by Collins in 1994 and eclipsed by Navarre in 2003.

Game summaries

Notre Dame

Michigan was ranked #3 and traveled to South Bend to play the #3 ranked Fighting Irish. After falling behind 7-0, Michigan scored 17 straight points on a Tyrone Wheatley 27 yard run, Pete Elezovic’s 28 yard field goal and Derrick Alexander’s 30 yard TD pass reception from Elvis Grbac. Notre Dame rallied in the 4th quarter on a Jerome Bettis 2 yard run and Craig Hentrich’s 32 yard field goal to tie the game 17-17. Grbac finished the game completing 17 of 28 passes for 242 yards, but threw 3 interceptions.

Oklahoma State
Todd Collins led the way for #6 ranked Michigan as he threw for 285 yards on 29 completions in 42 attempts and two touchdown passes to Derrick Alexander as the Wolverines cruised to a 35-3 victory over Oklahoma State. Ricky Powers ran for two touchdowns and Ed Davis ran for one as the Michigan offense rolled up 501 yards of total offense. The Wolverine defense held the Cowboys 187 yards of total offense, while Dwayne Ware, Corwin Brown and Steve Morrison each had interceptions.

Houston
Tyrone Wheatley returned the opening kickoff 99 yards for a touchdown and the #4 ranked Wolverines never looked back as they routed the Cougars, 61-7. Todd Collins completed 17 of 24 passes for 205 yards and threw 4 touchdown passes, including two to Tony McGee. Ed Davis ran for 108 yards and a touchdown. Wheatley and Derrick Alexander each ran for one touchdown and Mercury Hayes, Jesse Johnson and Amani Toomer each caught a TD pass. The Wolverines rang up 537 yards of total offense. The defense held Houston to 276 yards of total offense and Steve Morrison and Shonte Peoples had interceptions. Houston scored with 3:42 left in the game to avoid the shutout.

Iowa

Tyrone Wheatley 19 Rush, 224 Yds 

Iowa couldn't stop Michigan's powerful offense, led by Tyrone Wheatley, who rushed for a career-high 224 yards and three touchdowns on 19 carries. The Wolverines scored a touchdown on their first 3 possessions, and were up 31-0 in the 2nd quarter. The Hawkeyes fought back, but it was too little too late. QB Jim Hartlieb was harassed by the Wolverines all day, and finished with 25 completions in 39 attempts for 308 yards and three touchdowns, but had 3 interceptions. Ricky Powers, Che Foster and Burnie Legette all ran for touchdowns and Tony McGee caught a touchdown pass from Elvis Grbac. Alfie Burch, Matt Dyson, Shonte Peoples and Deon Johnson each had interceptions for the Wolverines.

Michigan State
The #3 ranked Wolverines raced to a 28-0 lead in the first half and cruised to a 35-10 victory over the Spartans. Tyrone Wheatley rushed for 172 yards and two touchdowns to lead the Michigan offense. Derrick Alexander returned a punt 80 yards for a touchdown in the 2nd quarter. Jesse Johnson and Burnie Legette added touchdown runs while the Wolverine defense held MSU to 60 yards rushing. Marcus Walker led the defense with 12 tackles and an interception.

Indiana
After falling behind 3-0 midway through the 1st quarter, the #3 ranked Wolverines ripped off 31 straight 1st half points to beat Indiana, 31-3. Both teams went scoreless in the 2nd half. Tyrone Wheatley caught a 26 yard TD pass from Elvis Grbac and ran 54 yards for a touchdown. Derrick Alexander caught an 8 yard TD pass from Grbac, then finished up the scoring with a 70 yard punt return for a touchdown. Wheatley finished the game with 134 yards rushing. The Michigan defense held the Hoosiers offense to 149 yards.

Minnesota
Derrick Alexander caught 4 touchdown passes from Elvis Grbac as the Wolverines pummeled the Golden Gophers 63-13 at the Big House. Alexander finished with 130 yards on 7 catches while Grbac finished with 208 yards, completing 14 of 19 passes. Tyrone Wheatley ran for 148 yards and ran for two touchdowns. The Wolverine offense rolled up 627 yards of total offense while the defense held Minnesota to 227 yards of total offense. Ed Davis, Walter Smith and Che Foster each ran for touchdowns for Michigan. Ninef Aghakhan had an interception for the Wolverines.

1,000th game in school history

Elvis Grbac breaks Jim Harbaugh's school record for career passing yardage.

Purdue
Purdue led #3 ranked Michigan 17-7 at halftime, but the Wolverines rallied in the 2nd half with 17 points to pull out a 24-17 victory over the Boilermakers at Ross-Ade Stadium. Walter Smith caught a 43 yard TD pass from Elvis Grbac for the Wolverines first points. Grbac hit Tony McGee for 10 yards and touchdown to pull Michigan within 17-14, then Jesse Johnson ran 3 yards for the go-ahead touchdown. Pelezovic added a 25 yard field goal. Johnson ran for 118 yards while Grbac finished with 169 yards, completing 17 of 24 passes. Pat Maloney had an interception for the Wolverine defense.

MICH: J. Johnson 20 Rush, 118 Yds

Northwestern
The #4 ranked Wolverines raced to a 30-7 halftime lead behind Derrick Alexander’s 3 touchdown receptions from Elvis Grbac. Alexander finished the game with 3 catches for 91 yards, while teammate Amani Toomer had 3 catches for 112 yards. Tyrone Wheatley had another big day, rushing for 148 yards and a touchdown. Mercury Hayes caught an 11 yard TD pass from Todd Collins. Michigan had 495 yards of total offense while the defense held the Wildcats to 220 yards, with only 8 yards on the ground. 

Source:

Illinois
Before a packed house of over 106,000 fans at Michigan Stadium, #3 Michigan and Illinois battled to a 22-22 tie. Pete Elezovic had to kick a 39 yard field goal with 16 seconds left to keep Michigan unbeaten on the season. Tyrone Wheatley caught a 50 yard TD pass from Elvis Grbac to give Michigan a 7-0 lead. Jesse Johnson ran for two touchdowns and 121 yards on the ground. His 11 yard run gave the Wolverines a 19-15 lead with 6:56 left in the game. Jason Verduzco scored from 2 yards out to give the Illini a 22-19 lead that held up until Elezovic saved the Wolverines with his field goal. Grbac completed 21 of 29 passes for 278 yards, but threw two costly interceptions. The Wolverines rushed for 245 yards.

Ohio State

Ohio State pulled within 13-12 of the sixth ranked Wolverines on Kirk Herbstreit's 5-yard touchdown pass to Greg Beatty with 4:24 remaining, but the Buckeyes bypassed an attempt for a two point conversion to kick the extra point that ended up the final score, a 13-13 tie. After falling behind 3-0, Michigan scored on an Elvis Grbac 3 yard run, but Pete Elezovic extra point kick was no good, which proved to be crucial. Grbac was injured on the play and did not return. Todd Collins scored on a 1 yard run to push the Wolverines lead to 13-3 late in the 3rd quarter. The Buckeyes pulled within 13-6 on a Tim Williams 30 yard field goal early in the 4th quarter. Tyrone Wheatley led Michigan with 100 yards rushing, but the passing game was non-existent, accounting for 71 yards.

Rose Bowl

Tyrone Wheatley 15 Rush, 235 Yds 

Trailing, 7-3, the Wolverines energized their fans who made the trip to California on a 49 yard touchdown pass from Elvis Grbac to Tony McGee, which capped a six play, 69 yard drive and provided Michigan the lead after the first quarter. On its next possession, Michigan opened up a 17-7 lead as Tyrone Wheatley, on his way to a 235 yard rushing performance, sprinted untouched 56 yards for a touchdown. In this offensive showdown, the Huskies responded with two straight touchdowns -- a 64 yard touchdown pass from Mark Brunell to Jason Shelley and an 18 yard touchdown strike from Brunell to Mark Bruener. Washington took a 21-17 lead into the halftime intermission. Wheatley then went to work, taking advantage of a key block by All-American Steve Everitt on an 88 yard touchdown run--his second long scoring play and a new Rose Bowl record. But the Huskies were far from through. They put together 10 straight points and went ahead 31-24 until Wheatley responded. His third touchdown run of the game--24 yard scamper on a draw play--tied the game at 31 and swung the momentum back to Michigan. The Wolverines' game winning score came on an 80 yard drive, as Grbac, facing third and short from the Huskies' 15 yard line, found McGee at the two. McGee fell into the endzone for the only score of the fourth quarter, the winning points in Michigan's thrilling 38-31 victory.

Awards and honors

The individuals in the sections below earned recognition for meritorious performances.

National
All-Americans: Joe Cocozzo, Chris Hutchinson, Derrick Alexander
Academic All-American: Hutchinson (second team)

Conference

All-Conference: Elvis Grbac, Chris Hutchinson, Derrick Alexander, Corwin Brown, Joe Cocozzo, Rob Doherty, Matt Dyson, Steve Everitt, Tony McGee, Shonte Peoples, Doug Skene, Tyrone Wheatley
Big Ten Offensive Player of the Year: Wheatley 
Big Ten Defensive Lineman of the Year: Hutchinson
Big Ten Dave McClain Coach of the Year: Gary Moeller

Team
Captains: Corwin Brown, Elvis Grbac, Chris Hutchinson
Most Valuable Player: Chris Hutchinson
Meyer Morton Award: Chris Hutchinson
John Maulbetsch Award: Tyrone Wheatley
Frederick Matthei Award: Tony Henderson
Arthur Robinson Scholarship Award: Chris Hutchinson
Dick Katcher Award: Chris Hutchinson
Hugh Rader Jr. Award: Steve Everitt
Robert P. Ufer Award: Corwin Brown
Roger Zatkoff Award: Steve Morrison

Coaching staff
Head coach: Gary Moeller
Assistant coaches: Cam Cameron, Lloyd Carr, Mike DeBord, Bill Harris, Jim Herrmann, Fred Jackson, Greg Mattison, Les Miles, Bobby Morrison
Trainer: Paul Schmidt
Managers: Joe Allore, Brian Bickner, Kevin Bickner, Milton Heath, Dave Henderson, Andy Riegler, Lance Satterthwaite, Mark Vainisi, Arnando Velasquez, Mike Weiskopf

References

External links
  1992 Football Team -- Bentley Historical Library, University of Michigan Athletics History

Michigan
Michigan Wolverines football seasons
Big Ten Conference football champion seasons
Rose Bowl champion seasons
College football undefeated seasons
Michigan Wolverines football